The Politburo of the 14th Congress of the All-Union Communist Party (Bolsheviks) was in session from 1 January 1926 to 19 December 1927.

Composition

Members

Candidates

References

Politburo of the Central Committee of the Communist Party of the Soviet Union members
Politburo
Politburo
Politburo
Politburo
Politburo